li

The Rajya Sabha (meaning the "Council of States") is the upper house of the Parliament of India. Uttarakhand state elects three members and they are indirectly elected by the members of Uttarakhand Legislative Assembly. Members are elected for six years and one-third of members are retired after every two years. The number of seats allocated to the party, are determined by the number of seats a party possesses during nomination and the party nominates a member to be voted on. Elections within the state legislatures are held using single transferable voting with proportional representation.

Current members (2022)
Keys:

List of all Rajya Sabha members from Uttarakhand
This is the list of all Rajya Sabha members from Uttarakhand in chronological order.

Keys:  

Source: Parliament of India (Rajya Sabha)

See also
 List of Lok Sabha members from Uttarakhand
 List of parliamentary constituencies in Uttarakhand

References

External links
Rajya Sabha homepage hosted by the Indian government
Rajya Sabha FAQ page hosted by the Indian government
Who's who list
State wise list

Uttarakhand-related lists
Uttarakhand
 
Lists of people from Uttarakhand